Coningsby Waldo-Sibthorpe (1781–1822) was an English politician.

Waldo-Sibthorpe was educated at Louth Grammar School, Westminster School and Corpus Christi College, Oxford. He was Member of Parliament (MP) for Lincoln from 1814 until his death.

References 

1781 births
People educated at King Edward VI Grammar School, Louth
People educated at Westminster School, London
Alumni of Corpus Christi College, Oxford
1822 deaths
Members of the Parliament of the United Kingdom for English constituencies
UK MPs 1812–1818
UK MPs 1818–1820
UK MPs 1820–1826